Anna Bailey Coles (1925-3 Feb 2015) was the founding dean of Howard University’s College of Nursing.

Background
Coles was born in Kansas city and became the supervisor of the Veterans’ Administration Hospital in Topeka Kansas from 1950 for a period of 8 years. While working at the hospital Coles began studying her Bachelor of Science (BS) at Avila College in Missouri, graduating in 1958, and then attended the Catholic University of America to study her Masters of Science (MS) in 1960 and her PhD in 1967. Coles became the director of nursing at Freedman's Hospital from 1961–1968, when as act of Congress to transfer Freedmen's Hospital School of Nursing over to Howard's jurisdiction, and Coles became the dean of the School of Nursing in 1969.

Coles died on 3 Feb 2015 and left a legacy in the form of scholarship fund in her name at Howard University's College of Nursing.

References

Catholic University of America alumni
Howard University
American women nurses
African-American nurses
20th-century American women scientists
21st-century American women scientists
1925 births
20th-century American physicians
20th-century American women physicians
20th-century women physicians
Scientists from Kansas
2015 deaths
20th-century African-American women
20th-century African-American people
21st-century African-American women
21st-century African-American scientists